Hydrolysis is any chemical reaction in which a molecule of water breaks one or more chemical bonds. The term is used broadly for substitution, elimination, and solvation reactions in which water is the nucleophile.

Biological hydrolysis is the cleavage of biomolecules where a water molecule is consumed to effect the separation of a larger molecule into component parts. When a carbohydrate is broken into its component sugar molecules by hydrolysis (e.g., sucrose being broken down into glucose and fructose), this is recognized as saccharification.

Hydrolysis reactions can be the reverse of a condensation reaction in which two molecules join into a larger one and eject a water molecule. Thus hydrolysis adds water to break down, whereas condensation builds up by removing water.

Types
Usually hydrolysis is a chemical process in which a molecule of water is added to a substance. Sometimes this addition causes both the substance and water molecule to split into two parts. In such reactions, one fragment of the target molecule (or parent molecule) gains a hydrogen ion. It breaks a chemical bond in the compound.

Salts
A common kind of hydrolysis occurs when a salt of a weak acid or weak base (or both) is dissolved in water. Water spontaneously ionizes into hydroxide anions and hydronium cations. The salt also dissociates into its constituent anions and cations. For example, sodium acetate dissociates in water into sodium and acetate ions. Sodium ions react very little with the hydroxide ions whereas the acetate ions combine with hydronium ions to produce acetic acid. In this case the net result is a relative excess of hydroxide ions, yielding a basic solution.

Strong acids also undergo hydrolysis. For example, dissolving sulfuric acid in water is accompanied by hydrolysis to give hydronium and bisulfate, the sulfuric acid's conjugate base. For a more technical discussion of what occurs during such a hydrolysis, see Brønsted–Lowry acid–base theory.

Esters and amides
Acid–base-catalysed hydrolyses are very common; one example is the hydrolysis of amides or esters. Their hydrolysis occurs when the nucleophile (a nucleus-seeking agent, e.g., water or hydroxyl ion) attacks the carbon of the carbonyl group of the ester or amide. In an aqueous base, hydroxyl ions are better nucleophiles than polar molecules such as water. In acids, the carbonyl group becomes protonated, and this leads to a much easier nucleophilic attack. The products for both hydrolyses are compounds with carboxylic acid groups.

Perhaps the oldest commercially practiced example of ester hydrolysis is saponification (formation of soap). It is the hydrolysis of a triglyceride (fat) with an aqueous base such as sodium hydroxide (NaOH). During the process, glycerol is formed, and the fatty acids react with the base, converting them to salts. These salts are called soaps, commonly used in households.

In addition, in living systems, most biochemical reactions (including ATP hydrolysis) take place during the catalysis of enzymes. The catalytic action of enzymes allows the hydrolysis of proteins, fats, oils, and carbohydrates. As an example, one may consider proteases (enzymes that aid digestion by causing hydrolysis of peptide bonds in proteins). They catalyze the hydrolysis of interior peptide bonds in peptide chains, as opposed to exopeptidases (another class of enzymes, that catalyze the hydrolysis of terminal peptide bonds, liberating one free amino acid at a time).

However, proteases do not catalyze the hydrolysis of all kinds of proteins. Their action is stereo-selective: Only proteins with a certain tertiary structure are targeted as some kind of orienting force is needed to place the amide group in the proper position for catalysis. The necessary contacts between an enzyme and its substrates (proteins) are created because the enzyme folds in such a way as to form a crevice into which the substrate fits; the crevice also contains the catalytic groups. Therefore, proteins that do not fit into the crevice will not undergo hydrolysis. This specificity preserves the integrity of other proteins such as hormones, and therefore the biological system continues to function normally.

Upon hydrolysis, an amide converts into a carboxylic acid and an amine or ammonia (which in the presence of acid are immediately converted to ammonium salts). One of the two oxygen groups on the carboxylic acid are derived from a water molecule and the amine (or ammonia) gains the hydrogen ion. The hydrolysis of peptides gives amino acids.

Many polyamide polymers such as nylon 6,6 hydrolyze in the presence of strong acids. The process leads to depolymerization. For this reason nylon products fail by fracturing when exposed to small amounts of acidic water. Polyesters are also susceptible to similar polymer degradation reactions. The problem is known as environmental stress cracking.

ATP
Hydrolysis is related to energy metabolism and storage. All living cells require a continual supply of energy for two main purposes: the biosynthesis of micro and macromolecules, and the active transport of ions and molecules across cell membranes. The energy derived from the oxidation of nutrients is not used directly but, by means of a complex and long sequence of reactions, it is channeled into a special energy-storage molecule, adenosine triphosphate (ATP). The ATP molecule contains pyrophosphate linkages (bonds formed when two phosphate units are combined) that release energy when needed. ATP can undergo hydrolysis in two ways: Firstly, the removal of terminal phosphate to form adenosine diphosphate (ADP) and inorganic phosphate, with the reaction:

 ATP + H2O -> ADP + P_{i}

Secondly, the removal of a terminal diphosphate to yield adenosine monophosphate (AMP) and pyrophosphate. The latter usually undergoes further cleavage into its two constituent phosphates. This results in biosynthesis reactions, which usually occur in chains, that can be driven in the direction of synthesis when the phosphate bonds have undergone hydrolysis.

Polysaccharides

Monosaccharides can be linked together by glycosidic bonds, which can be cleaved by hydrolysis. Two, three, several or many monosaccharides thus linked form disaccharides, trisaccharides, oligosaccharides, or polysaccharides, respectively. Enzymes that hydrolyze glycosidic bonds are called "glycoside hydrolases" or "glycosidases".

The best-known disaccharide is sucrose (table sugar). Hydrolysis of sucrose yields glucose and fructose. Invertase is a sucrase used industrially for the hydrolysis of sucrose to so-called invert sugar. Lactase is essential for digestive hydrolysis of lactose in milk; many adult humans do not produce lactase and cannot digest the lactose in milk.

The hydrolysis of polysaccharides to soluble sugars can be recognized as saccharification. Malt made from barley is used as a source of β-amylase to break down starch into the disaccharide maltose, which can be used by yeast to produce beer. Other amylase enzymes may convert starch to glucose or to oligosaccharides. Cellulose is first hydrolyzed to cellobiose by cellulase and then cellobiose is further hydrolyzed to glucose by beta-glucosidase. Ruminants such as cows are able to hydrolyze cellulose into cellobiose and then glucose because of symbiotic bacteria that produce cellulases.

Metal aqua ions

Metal ions are Lewis acids, and in aqueous solution they form metal aquo complexes of the general formula . The aqua ions undergo hydrolysis, to a greater or lesser extent. The first hydrolysis step is given generically as

M(H2O)_\mathit{n}^{\mathit{m}+}{} + H2O <=> M(H2O)_{\mathit{n}-1}(OH)^{(\mathit{m}-1){}+}{} + H3O+

Thus the aqua cations behave as acids in terms of Brønsted–Lowry acid–base theory. This effect is easily explained by considering the inductive effect of the positively charged metal ion, which weakens the  bond of an attached water molecule, making the liberation of a proton relatively easy.

The dissociation constant, pKa, for this reaction is more or less linearly related to the charge-to-size ratio of the metal ion.

Hydrolysis may proceed beyond the first step, often with the formation of polynuclear species via the process of olation. These substances, major constituents of bauxite, are known as laterites and are formed by leaching from rocks of most of the ions other than aluminium and iron and subsequent hydrolysis of the remaining aluminium and iron.

Mechanism strategies
Acetals, imines, and enamines can be converted back into ketones by treatment with excess water under acid-catalyzed conditions: ; ; .

See also

 Acid hydrolysis
 Adenosine triphosphate
 Alkaline hydrolysis (body disposal)
 Catabolism
 Condensation reaction
 Dehydration reaction
 Hydrolysis constant
 Inhibitor protein
 Polymer degradation
 Proteolysis
 Saponification
 Sol–gel polymerisation
 Solvolysis
 Thermal hydrolysis

References

Chemical reactions
Equilibrium chemistry